is a Japanese company that produces anime, games, character goods, music, and books. Softgarage was the company that produced the GR: Giant Robo anime. Though Softgarage primarily focuses on the production of original video animation (OVAs), it has also worked on anime television series and anime film. Recently, Softgarage has also started to produce anime related goods, such as mousepads.

They also own the hentai OVA label, Pink Pineapple which they inherited when they bought the rights to KSS's assets after KSS went bankrupt in 2005.

History
The company was first founded on July 26, 1989.

Major works

OVA series
Guardian Hearts/Guardian Hearts! Power UP! 
Wind: A Breath of Heart 
Lime-iro Senkitan 
_Summer 
Minami no Teiō

Anime television
Kakyuusei 2
GR: Giant Robo
Lime-iro Senkitan

Other
Natural Woman (film)
Mujara (art book series)

References

External links
Softgarage official website

1989 establishments in Japan
Anime companies
Companies established in 1989
Entertainment companies of Japan
Video game companies of Japan
Video game publishers
Software companies based in Tokyo
Comic book publishing companies in Tokyo
Book publishing companies in Tokyo